Ali Kaveh (born 1946 in Amol) is an Iranian photojournalist.

He started his professional career when he was 15, and covered many international major events during his life. 1973 International Wrestling Championship in Tehran was the first International sport event covered by him. Ali Kaveh has also attended 1974 Asian Games in Tehran, 1976 Olympic Games in Montreal, 1990 Asian Games in Beijing, EURO 1992 in Sweden, Atlanta 1996 Olympic Games and FIFA World Cup France 1998.

He is famous in Iran because he took the picture of Ayatollah Khomeini, which printed on Iranian 10,000 rials note.

Major Events Covered 

 1973 International Wrestling Championship
 Asian Games 1974 Tehran
 1976 Summer Olympic Games Montreal
 1990 Asian Games Beijing
 UEFA EURO 1992 Sweden
 1996 Summer Olympic Games Atlanta
 1998 FIFA World Cup France

References 

Living people
1946 births
People from Amol
Iranian photographers
Iranian photojournalists